The Roue 20 is a Canadian sailboat, that was designed by William James Roué.

Roué was born in Halifax, Nova Scotia in 1879. He lived in Dartmouth, Nova Scotia and worked from 1899 to 1931 for the family firm, Roué's Carbonated Waters, when he design the boat in 1922.

Most sailboats are named for their imperial or metric length overall, but the Roue 20's designation instead indicates it was William J. Roué's 20th design.

Design

The Roue 20 is a small recreational keelboat, built predominantly of wood, with wood trim, although some newer ones incorporate some fiberglass. It has a fractional sloop rig, a keel-mounted rudder and a fixed long keel. It displaces .

See also
List of sailing boat types

Related designs
Bluenose one-design sloop

Similar sailboats
Beneteau 31
Corvette 31
Douglas 31
Hunter 31
Hunter 31-2
Hunter 310
Hunter 320
Marlow-Hunter 31
Tanzer 31

References

External links

Keelboats
1920s sailboat type designs
Sailing yachts
Sailboat type designs by William James Roué